The  is an ancient cherry tree in Miharu, Fukushima, in northern Japan. It is a weeping higan cherry (Prunus subhirtella var. pendula ‘Itosakura’. syn. Prunus spachiana ‘Pendula Rosea’. Benishidare-zakura in Japanese) and is over 1,000 years old.

It flowers in mid to late April, and its light pink flowers spread in all directions from the branches, like a waterfall.

The Tree

It is classified as one of the five great cherry trees of Japan (日本五大桜) and one of the three giant cherry trees of Japan (日本三巨大桜). It was designated a national treasure in 1922. Polls frequently rank it as the number one tree in all of Japan.

Around 300,000 people visit the Miharu Takizakura every year, making it an important source of income for Miharu, which is otherwise a farming community of around 17,000 people.

Damage
The tree suffered some damage from heavy snow in January 2005, breaking several branches; residents brushed off the snow and built wooden supports to limit damage. It was unharmed by the 2011 Tōhoku earthquake and tsunami, but in the immediate aftermath of the Fukushima nuclear disaster the number of visitors decreased markedly.

While in 2011, the number of visitors was less than half the usual amount, in 2012, visitors returned to the tree.

See also
Miharu, Fukushima
Miharu Dam

References
 This article was partly translated from the Japanese Wikipedia article "三春滝桜".

External links 
 , Fukushima Prefecture Tourism Information

Individual trees in Japan
Tourist attractions in Fukushima Prefecture
Miharu, Fukushima